Panicum urvilleanum is a species of grass known by the common names desert panicgrass and silky panicgrass. It is native to the southwestern United States and northern Mexico, where it grows in sandy habitat, including the dunes of the deserts. It is also known in parts of South America.

This is a stoloniferous perennial grass growing up to a meter tall with hairy leaves up to 45 centimeters long. The inflorescence is a branching, spreading panicle up to 35 centimeters long bearing oval-shaped spikelets coated in downy white or silvery hairs.

External links
Jepson Manual Treatment
USDA Plants Profile
Grass Manual Treatment
Photo gallery

urvilleanum
Grasses of the United States
Native grasses of California
Grasses of Mexico
Flora of Northwestern Mexico
Flora of the Southwestern United States
Flora of the Sonoran Deserts
Flora of the California desert regions
Flora of South America
Flora without expected TNC conservation status